Angelo Quaglio (1778–1815) was an architect, scenic designer, and painter born into the Quaglio family of artists. He was the eldest son of Giuseppe Quaglio. He designed and painted landscapes and architectural pictures for Boisserée's work on Cologne Cathedral.

References

1778 births
1815 deaths
German scenic designers
Opera designers
18th-century Italian painters
Italian male painters
19th-century Italian painters
19th-century Italian male artists
18th-century Italian male artists